In theoretical computer science, a small-bias sample space (also known as -biased sample space,  -biased generator, or small-bias probability space) is a probability distribution that fools parity functions.
In other words, no parity function can distinguish between a small-bias sample space and the uniform distribution with high probability, and hence, small-bias sample spaces naturally give rise to pseudorandom generators for parity functions.

The main useful property of small-bias sample spaces is that they need far fewer truly random bits than the uniform distribution to fool parities.  Efficient constructions of small-bias sample spaces have found many applications in computer science, some of which are derandomization, error-correcting codes, and probabilistically checkable proofs.
The connection with error-correcting codes is in fact very strong since -biased sample spaces are equivalent to -balanced error-correcting codes.

Definition

Bias

For , the empty sum is defined to be zero, and hence .

ϵ-biased sample space 

holds for all non-empty subsets .

ϵ-biased set 
An -biased sample space  that is generated by picking a uniform element from a multiset  is called -biased set.
The size  of an -biased set  is the size of the multiset that generates the sample space.

ϵ-biased generator 
An -biased generator  is a function that maps strings of length  to strings of length  such that the multiset  is an -biased set. The seed length of the generator is the number  and is related to the size of the -biased set  via the equation .

Connection with epsilon-balanced error-correcting codes 
There is a close connection between -biased sets and -balanced linear error-correcting codes.
A linear code  of message length  and block length  is

Constructions of small epsilon-biased sets 
This is because a smaller size  means that the amount of randomness needed to pick a random element from the set is smaller, and so the set can be used to fool parities using few random bits.

Theoretical bounds 
The probabilistic method gives a non-explicit construction that achieves size .
The construction is non-explicit in the sense that finding the -biased set requires a lot of true randomness, which does not help towards the goal of reducing the overall randomness.
However, this non-explicit construction is useful because it shows that these efficient codes exist.

Explicit constructions 
There are many explicit, i.e., deterministic constructions of -biased sets with various parameter settings:
  achieve . The construction makes use of Justesen codes (which is a concatenation of Reed–Solomon codes with the Wozencraft ensemble) as well as expander walk sampling.
  achieve . One of their constructions is the concatenation of Reed–Solomon codes with the Hadamard code; this concatenation turns out to be an -balanced code, which gives rise to an -biased sample space via the connection mentioned above.
  achieves .
  achieves  which is almost optimal because of the lower bound.
These bounds are mutually incomparable.

Application: almost k-wise independence 
An important application of small-bias sets lies in the construction of almost k-wise independent sample spaces.

k-wise independent spaces 
That is, for all such  and all strings , the distribution  satisfies .

Constructions and bounds 
k-wise independent spaces are fairly well understood.
 A simple construction by  achieves size .

Joffe's construction 
The initial  marginals of the distribution are drawn independently and uniformly at random:
.

The distribution  is uniform on its support, and hence, the support of  forms a -wise independent set.
It contains all  strings in  that have been extended to strings of length  using the deterministic rule above.

Almost k-wise independent spaces 

Constructions 
 give a general framework for combining small k-wise independent spaces with small -biased spaces to obtain -almost k-wise independent spaces of even smaller size.

Notes

References 

 
 
 
 
 
 
 
 
Pseudorandomness
Theoretical computer science